Sutthisan station (code BL17) is a Bangkok MRT station on the Blue Line located under Ratchadaphisek Road, near Sutthisan neighbourhood. The station's symbol color is  red.

References 

MRT (Bangkok) stations
Railway stations opened in 2004
2004 establishments in Thailand